Nicole-Reine Lepaute née Étable de la Brière, also erroneously known as Hortense Lepaute, (5 January 1723 – 6 December 1788) was a French astronomer and human computer. Lepaute along with Alexis Clairaut and Jérôme Lalande calculated the date of the return of Halley's Comet. Her other astronomical feats include calculating the 1764 solar eclipse and producing almanacs from 1759 to 1783. She was also a member of the Scientific .

The asteroid 7720 Lepaute is named in her honour, as is the lunar crater Lepaute.

Early life
Nicole-Reine Lepaute was born on 5 January 1723 in the Luxembourg Palace in Paris as the daughter of Jean Étable, valet in the service of Louise Élisabeth d'Orléans. Her father had worked for the royal family for a long time, both in the service of the duchess de Berry and her sister Louise. She was the sixth of nine children. As a child she was described as precocious and intelligent, being mostly self-taught. She stayed up all night "devouring" books and read every book in the library, with Jérôme Lalande saying of her that even as a child "she had too much spirit not to be curious".

In August 1748, she married Jean-André Lepaute, a royal clockmaker in the Luxembourg Palace.

Early career: mathematics of clockmaking 

Her marriage gave her the freedom to exercise her scientific skill. At the same time as she kept the household's accounts, she studied astronomy, mathematics, and "she observed, she calculated, and she described the inventions of her husband".

She met Jérôme Lalande, with whom she would work for thirty years, in 1753 when he was called as a representative of the Académie des Sciences to inspect her husband's work on a pendulum of a new type. The three of them worked together on a book titled Traité d'horlogerie (Treatise of Clockmaking) that was published in 1755 under her husband's name. Although she did not receive authorship, Lalande sang her praises later, saying, "Madame Lepaute computed for this book a table of numbers of oscillations for pendulums of different lengths, or the lengths for each given number of vibrations, from that of 18 lignes, that does 18000 vibrations per hour, up to that of 3000 leagues".

Halley's Comet 
In June 1757, she worked together with Jérôme Lalande and Alexis Clairaut to calculate the date of the next passage of Halley's comet, last seen in 1682. Halley couldn't precisely compute the return date beyond "around the end of the year 1758 or the beginning of the next", due to the gravitational pull of Jupiter and Saturn on the comet, which made for a three-body problem that couldn't be solved back then, for which Clairaut had found a solution recently.

In order to solve it, Clairaut, Lalande and Lepaute divided calculations between them and worked in parallel, with Lepaute and Lalande focusing on the attraction of Jupiter and Saturn, while Clairaut calculated the orbit of the comet itself. The team worked for more than six months straight, barely stopping for food, in order to produce a date before the comet arrived. In November 1758, they gave a two-months window for when the comet would reach its perihelion, between 15 March and 15 May,  centered around 13 April 1759. The comet ended up arriving on 13 March 1759.

Although this was a tenfold improvement over Halley's initial 2 years period, there was still an error of a few days, which caused the astronomer Jean d'Alembert to ridicule their work and call it "more laborious than deep".

Lepaute's involvement largely went unrecognised, and, while Lalande acknowledged her work in his Théorie des Comètes (Comet Theory), insisting that they could never have done the calculations without her, Clairault removed mentions of her from the book he published in 1760, Théorie du mouvement des comètes, allegedly to please another woman.

Later mathematical accomplishments 
In 1759, Lalande became the Director of the Connaissance des Temps (Knowledge of the times), an astronomical almanach published by the Académie des Sciences, and he appointed Lepaute as his assistant. She did calculations from the computing plans Lalande prepared until 1774 and made various contributions to the almanac, including calculations on a 1762 comet, as well as a table of parallactic angles.

Afterwards, she worked on Éphémerides, annual guides for astronomers and navigators. She calculated the position of Saturn for each day of the year from 1775 to 1784 for the seventh volume, published in 1774, and she calculated on her own the daily positions of the sun, the moon and the planets for the eighth volume (1785-1792, published 1784).

She also computed in 1762 the exact time of an annular solar eclipse that occurred on 1 April 1764 and published two maps under own name that showed the eclipse's extent: one over Europe, which showed the eclipse's transit in 15-minutes intervals, and one that detailed its successive phases over Paris.

Her work went largely unappreciated and unrewarded despite its importance. While Lalande would eventually become a professor of astronomy and the director of the Paris Observatory, she kept working for him for fifteen years as a human computer. She nonetheless became a member of the distinguished Scientific Academy of Béziers in 1761, for which she calculated the ephemeris of the transit of Venus this year. Lalande always recognised her work, and, after her death, he wrote a brief biography about her contributions to astronomy in his Astronomical Bibliography.

Doing so many calculations over the course of thirty years affected her sight to the point she had to stop working in 1783.

Personal life 
While childless herself, she adopted her husband's nephew, Joseph Lepaute Dagelet in 1768 and trained him in astronomy and advanced mathematics, which Lalande includes in her contributions to astronomy.  He travelled south to the Terra Australis in 1773, became a professor of mathematics at Paris' Military School and became inducted in the French Royal Academy of Sciences in 1785. He most likely died in a shipwreck during a scientific expedition led by Jean-François de Lapérouse in 1788.

Nicole Lepaute spent the last seven years of her life taking care of her terminally ill husband until she died in Paris, in the parish of Saint-Roch, on 6 December 1788.

List of works

 Tables of the length a pendulum must have for a given number of oscillations per hour, in Jean-André Lepaute's Treatise of Clockmaking, Paris, augmented edition of 1767, first edited 1755
 Various contributions to the Connaissance des Temps from 1759 to 1774
 Lost memoirs for the Académie de Béziers from 1761
 Figure of the twelve phases of 1 April 1764 solar eclipse for Paris, 1762
 Map of the passage of the shadow of the moon over Europe during 1 April 1764, 1762
 Table of parallactic angles for Paris's latitude, La Connaissance des Temps, 1763, p133-144 and Exposition du calcul astronomique, Jérôme Lalande, 1762, Paris
 Ephemerides of Saturn, Ephemerides of celestial movements for the meridian of Paris, volume 7 (1775-1784), 1774
Ephemerides of the Sun, the moon and the planets, Ephemerides of celestial movements for the meridian of Paris, volume 8 (1785-1792), 1783

See also
 Louise du Pierry
 Timeline of women in science

Notes
Philibert Commerson attempted to name the Hydrangea flower Lepautia or Peautia after Lepaute. However, the flower's accepted name later became "Hortensia". This led to people believing Lepaute's name was Hortense, but the Larousse remarks that this is erroneous, and that the name probably came from hortus, garden.

References

External links

1723 births
1788 deaths
18th-century French astronomers
18th-century French mathematicians
Scientists from Paris
18th-century French women scientists
Human computers